Ferret-badgers are the six species of the genus Melogale, which is the only genus of the monotypic mustelid subfamily Helictidinae.

 Bornean ferret-badger (Melogale everetti)
 Chinese ferret-badger (Melogale moschata)
Formosan ferret-badger (Melogale subaurantiaca)
 Javan ferret-badger (Melogale orientalis)
 Burmese ferret-badger (Melogale personata)
 Vietnam ferret-badger (Melogale cucphuongensis)

References

 
Badgers
Mammals of Southeast Asia
Taxa named by Isidore Geoffroy Saint-Hilaire